Egmont Machado Krischke was first primate of the Anglican Episcopal Church of Brazil, serving from 1965 to 1971. The Seminário Teológico Dom Egmont Machado Krischke (SETEK) is named after him. He was consecrated on March 12, 1950.

References

1971 deaths
20th-century Anglican bishops in South America
Brazilian Anglican bishops
Anglican primates of Brazil
20th-century American clergy